Puerto Rico is competing at the 2013 World Aquatics Championships in Barcelona, Spain between 19 July and 4 August 2013.

Diving

Puerto Rico qualified two quotas for the following diving events.

Women

Swimming

Puerto Rican swimmers achieved qualifying standards in the following events (up to a maximum of 2 swimmers in each event at the A-standard entry time, and 1 at the B-standard):

Men

Women

References

External links
Barcelona 2013 Official Site
FPN web site

Nations at the 2013 World Aquatics Championships
2013 in Puerto Rican sports
Puerto Rico at the World Aquatics Championships